Francis Paget (20 March 18512 August 1911) was an English theologian, author and the 33rd Bishop of Oxford.

Life
He was the second son of the noted surgeon James, and brother of Luke (sometime Bishop of Stepney and of Chester).

He was educated at St Marylebone Grammar School, then at
Shrewsbury School and Christ Church, Oxford. Ordained priest  he became preacher at Whitehall in 1882 and Vicar of Bromsgrove in 1885. An eminent scholar, he was subsequently Regius Professor of Pastoral Theology at the University of Oxford and Dean at his old college.

After the death of William Stubbs in April 1901, Paget was recommended to succeed him as Bishop of Oxford. He was elected bishop the following month, and consecrated by the Archbishop of Canterbury in St Paul's Cathedral 29 June 1901. A couple of days later he was received by Edward VII and invested as Chancellor of the Order of the Garter, an office held by the Bishop of Oxford between 1837 and 1937.

Paget served as bishop until his death in 1911.

Paget's son Bernard was a General in the Army, and another son, Edward, was the first Anglican Archbishop of Central Africa. His daughter Edith married the priest and hymnwriter John Macleod Campbell Crum.

Selected works
1887: Faculties and Difficulties for Belief and Dis-belief
1891: The Spirit of Discipline
1895: Studies in the Christian Character
1899: An introduction to the fifth book of Hooker's treatise Of the laws of ecclesiastical policy
1900: The Redemption of War

References

Further reading
Paget, Stephen & Crum, J. M. C. (1913) Francis Paget. London: Macmillan

1851 births
1911 deaths
People educated at St Marylebone Grammar School
People educated at Shrewsbury School
Alumni of Christ Church, Oxford
Fellows of Christ Church, Oxford
Deans of Christ Church, Oxford
Bishops of Oxford
20th-century Church of England bishops
Regius Professors of Moral and Pastoral Theology
Younger sons of baronets
Chancellors of the Order of the Garter
19th-century Anglican theologians
20th-century Anglican theologians